Artis Reit Residential Tower, or 300 Main, is a multi-family residential high-rise building Main Street in Winnipeg, Manitoba, Canada. At 42 stories it is the tallest building in Manitoba.

Located at the intersection of Portage and Main in downtown Winnipeg, the building is connected to the Winnipeg Skywalk system, as well as other assets owned by Artis REIT, including 330 Main and the Winnipeg Square parkade. On its first floor will be an Earls restaurant, moving from down the road near The Forks.

This building, together with 300 Main and 360 Main, now spans almost an entire city block. It is the first-ever residential building to be located at Portage and Main. As of March 2021, at just above , the yet-to-be-complete structure already stands higher than the 201 Portage building, which has been Winnipeg's tallest tower since 1990.

References

Buildings and structures under construction in Canada
Buildings and structures in downtown Winnipeg